The Divine Emma is a Czech drama film directed by Jiří Krejčík. It was released in 1979. The film was selected as the Czechoslovakian entry for the Best Foreign Language Film at the 54th Academy Awards, but was not accepted as a nominee.

Plot
The film is a biographical account of operatic soprano Emmy Destinn's life. The primary focus is on the singer's return from the United States in 1914 and her subsequent involvement in the Czech patriotic resistance against Austria-Hungary during World War I.

Cast
 Božidara Turzonovová - Emmy Destinn (sung by Gabriela Beňačková)
 Juraj Kukura - Victor
 Miloš Kopecký - Samuel
 Jiří Adamíra - Colonel
 Václav Lohniský - Train dispatcher

See also
 List of submissions to the 54th Academy Awards for Best Foreign Language Film
 List of Czechoslovak submissions for the Academy Award for Best Foreign Language Film

References

External links
 

1979 films
Czechoslovak drama films
1970s Czech-language films
1970s biographical drama films
1970s historical drama films
Biographical films about entertainers
Czech biographical drama films
Czech historical drama films
Films set in 1914
Czech World War I films
1979 drama films
1970s Czech films